Yitzchak ben Nechemia Ratner (1857, Shklov, Russian Empire — ?) was a nineteenth-century Jewish maskilic mathematician. He wrote mathematical and astronomical articles for various journals, and was the author of Mishpat Emet (1884), a criticism of Lichtenfeld's pamphlets against Slonimski's works. In 1888 he edited a second edition of Slonimski's Yesodei Chokmat ha-Shi'ur on the principles of algebra.

References

 

1857 births
People from Shklow
Jewish scholars
Jewish scientists
19th-century mathematicians from the Russian Empire
Year of death missing